The women's speed competition in sport climbing at the 2005 World Games took place on 22 July 2005 at the Landschaftspark Duisburg-Nord in Duisburg, Germany.

Competition format
A total of 8 athletes entered the competition. After preliminary round they compete in the elimination system, in which they had to go 2 routes and their times were cumulated.

Results

Preliminary round

Competition bracket

References 

 
2005 World Games